Koxari is a village near Iraklion (Heraklion) in Crete.
It is in the Municipality of Gouves. The village is at an altitude of 180 meters and is 23.3 km from Heraklion.

Historical reports 

The village is reported in the following documents:

 Provincial plain in 1577 from Francesco Barozzi, as "Coxari"
 The Castle guard in 1583
 The Royal in 1630
 Turkish census of 1671 as "Koksari", with 42 taxes
 In a document of 1378 from the files of the Dukes of Chandacas (Heraklion) is reported "Costi coiri" from Chania.

The village was a feudal property of the Grego family and a part of the village was given as a dowry to Helena Grego, who married the poet Marco Antonio Foskolo.  Foskolo wrote the comedy "Furtunato" or "Fortounatos" in 1655 (see Greeklish).

Near Koxari is the "Keras Eleousas" monastery. Koxari belonged to the Latin Patriarchate.

Populated places in Heraklion (regional unit)